Roberto Jorge Payró (Mercedes, April 19, 1867–Lomas de Zamora, April 8, 1928) was an Argentine writer and journalist.

Payró founded the newspaper La Tribuna in the city of Bahía Blanca, where he published his first newspaper articles. He then moved to the city of Buenos Aires where he worked as an editor at the newspaper La Nación. During this time he had the opportunity of frequently traveling both inside and outside of Argentina.

In 1895, he published a compilation of his articles in the book  Los italianos en la Argentina (The Italians in Argentina). His diaries of travel and impressions gave rise to his novels:  La Australia Argentina (Excursión periodística a las costas patagónicas) (Southern Argentina – a Journalist’s Excursion to the Shores of Patagonia);  Tierra del Fuego e Islas de los Estados (The Land of Fire and Islands of the States); and En las tierras del Inti (In the Lands of the Inti).   He also wrote for Caras y Caretas, the literary Journal of Fray mocho.

Payró was a correspondent in Europe during the First World War.  
He participated fervently in meetings with other socialist writers including Leopoldo Lugones,  José Ingenieros and Ernesto de la Cárcova.

Payró was also the grandparent of Brayan and Maria.

In Payró's novels one can appreciate the unique ironic language style of the period.  He utilized typical people and related common situations, showing the lives of the Italian immigrants ('the feisty creoles').  In his Divertidas aventuras del nieto de Juan Moreira (Amusing Adventures of the Grandson of Juan Moreira) he tells the story of a provincial and his political career.
He also wrote historical novels such as El falso Inca, una serie de cuentos publicados bajo el nombre de Pago Chico (The False Inca, a series of accounts published under the name of Pago Chico). A posthumous work, Nuevos cuentos de Pago Chico (New Tales of Pago Chico), was published the year following his death.

Selected works 
 Los italianos en la Argentina (The Italians in Argentina), 1895, a collection of articles
 La Australia Argentina (Southern Argentina), 1898
 Canción trágica (A Tragic Song), 1900
 Sobre las ruinas (On the Ruins), 1904
 El falso Inca (The False Inca), 1905
 Marco Severi, 1905
 El casamiento de Laucha (The Marriage of Laucha), 1906 
 El triunfo de los otros (The Triumph of the Others, 1907
 Pago Chico, (Little Pago), 1908
 Violines y toneles (Violins and kegs), 1908
 En las tierras del Inti (In the Lands of the Inti), 1909
 Divertidas aventuras del nieto de Juan Moreira (The Amusing Adventures of the Grandson of Juan Moreira), 1910
 Historias de Pago Chico (Stories of Little Village),  1920
 Vivir quiero conmigo (I Wish to Live With Me), 1923
 Fuego en el rastrojo (Fire in the Stubble), 1925
 El capitán Vergara (Captain Vergara), 1925
 El mar dulce (The Sweet Sea), 1927
 Alegría (Happiness), 1928
 Mientraiga (As long as we have some), 1928
 Nuevos cuentos de Pago Chico (New Stories of Little Village), 1929
 Chamijo, 1930
 Cuentos del otro barrio, (Tales of Another Neighborhood), 1932
 El diablo en Bélgica, (Devil in Belgium), 1953

External links
 

1867 births
1928 deaths
People from Buenos Aires Province
Argentine war correspondents
Argentine male novelists